Hyefjorden is a fjord in Gloppen Municipality in Vestland county, Norway. The west side is where impassable mountains plunge straight into the fjord. Norwegian County Road 615 runs on the east side of the bay, with a series of tunnels through avalanche areas. The Hyefjorden flows from the village of Hyen at the south to the north where it flows into the large Nordfjorden.

See also
 List of Norwegian fjords

References

Fjords of Vestland
Gloppen